Chernivtsi National University (full name Yuriy Fedkovych Chernivtsi National University) is a public university in the City of Chernivtsi in Western Ukraine. One of the leading Ukrainian institutions for higher education, it was founded in 1875 as the Franz-Josephs-Universität Czernowitz when Chernivtsi (Czernowitz) was the capital of the Duchy of Bukovina, a Cisleithanian crown land of Austria-Hungary. Today the university is based at the Residence of Bukovinian and Dalmatian Metropolitans building complex, a UNESCO World Heritage Site since 2011.

History
In 1775, the Austrian Habsburg monarchy had obtained the territory of Bukovina, which from 1786 was administrated within the Chernivtsi district of Galicia. Under the rule of Emperor Joseph II, the sparsely populated territory was settled by German colonists, mainly from Swabia. Together with the Austrian administrative officials they formed a separate population group and by the late 19th century, several institutes of higher education arose with the German language of instruction, including Gymnasien in Chernivtsi and Suceava. As the graduates still had to leave Bukovina to study in the western parts of the Austro-Hungarian monarchy, the local administration developed plans to found their own university.

Franz-Josephs-Universität

In 1866, the Austrian Empire had lost the war against Prussia ending the German Confederation, followed by the foundation of the German Empire in 1871. In turn, the Habsburg emperor Francis Joseph I concentrated on strength and displays of power in his eastern crown lands. Plans for a Germanophone university were modelled on the 1872 establishment of the Straßburg Kaiser-Wilhelms-Universität, named after German Emperor William I, in annexed Alsace-Lorraine.

After the Lviv University had declared Polish teaching language in 1871, a Bukovina committee led by the jurist and liberal politician Constantin Tomashchuk (1840–1889), a member of the Imperial Council, called for the foundation of a German college in multilingual Czernowitz about  "beyond" Vienna. In 1874 they addressed a petition to the Austrian Minister of Education Karl von Stremayr, on whose proposal Emperor Francis Joseph finally resolved upon the establishment of a university, decided on by the two houses of the Imperial Council on 13 and 20 March 1875. Other cities applying for the creation of a college, such as Trieste, Olomouc, Brno, Ljubljana or Salzburg, were left empty-handed

One hundred years after the affiliation of Bukovina to the Austrian monarchy, the Franz-Josephs-Universität was inaugurated on 4 October 1875 (the name day of the emperor) on the basis of the Czernowitz Higher Theological School and Constantin Tomashchuk was appointed its first rector. The ensemble of the Residence, combining elements of national, Byzantine, Gothic and Baroque architecture, is an outstanding example of 19th-century historicist architecture, design and planning, expressing the cultural identity of the Orthodox Church within the Austro-Hungarian Empire.

Originally, the main language of instruction was German with separate departments for Ukrainian and Romanian and literature. German was the primary language even though the region it was located in, Bukovina, was not German-speaking, and other Austro-Hungarian universities outside of German-speaking areas were shifting away from German-medium teaching. During the period of Austro-Hungarian rule, the university operated three faculties: Greek Orthodox theology (the only one in Central Europe), jurisprudence and philosophy. To pursue the study of medicine, the Bukovina graduates still had to go to Lviv or to the Jagiellonian University in Kraków.

Though the general language of instruction was German, professorships on Romanian and Ruthenian language were also established. At the time of Austro-Hungarian rule, the majority of the Czernowitz students were Jewish and German Austrians, while Ukrainians and Romanians comprised for about 20%–25% of the student body. At times, there were more than 40 German, Ukrainian, Romanian, Polish, Jewish, and Catholic fraternities (Studentenverbindungen) in the city, reflecting its lingual and religious diversity.

In World War I, Czernowitz on the Eastern Front was embattled by Austro-Hungarian and Imperial Russian forces, severely affecting the university. Nevertheless, plans for a relocation to Salzburg in the west met with protests by academics like Eugen Ehrlich and Joseph Schumpeter. In June 1918 teaching activities were resumed upon the Treaty of Brest-Litovsk with Soviet Russia.

Universitatea Regele Carol I

After the dissolution of Austria-Hungary in 1918, Bukovina became part of the Kingdom of Romania and the university was renamed Universitatea Regele Carol I din Cernăuţi. From 1919 to 1940 the university was largely Romanized; the Ukrainian department was abolished, Ukrainian professors were dismissed and instruction was fully switched to Romanian. In 1933, of 3,247 students, there were 2,117 Romanians, 679 Jews, 199 Germans, 155 Ukrainians (decreasing from 239 out of 1671 students in 1920), 57 Poles, 26 Russians and 4 of other nationalities. Ion Nistor, a prominent Romanian historian and one of the most vocal proponents of Greater Romanian nationalism was the university rector for many years.

Chernivtsi State University
Upon the 1940 Soviet occupation of northern Bukovina, the territory was attached to the Ukrainian Soviet Socialist Republic and the primary language in the university was switched to Ukrainian.  At that time the original shaped wooden ceiling of the Synod Hall was lost to fire and was replaced in the 1950s. The roof has been gradually replaced using quality colour-glazed roof tiles manufactured according to the original patterns and imported from Austria. The change of function of the ensemble, initially being the Residence of Metropolitans and becoming a university did not unduly affect its authenticity.

The university, renamed Chernivtsi State University, was significantly expanded and reorganized. In 1976–1977, the university had 10,000 students and about 500 teachers, 26 specialists and doctors of sciences, about 290 associate professors and candidates of sciences.  Teaching of science was greatly increased and the theological department was dissolved and then reopened in 1996. In 1989 the university was named to honour Yuriy Fedkovych, a prominent Ukrainian writer, a native of Bukovina. In the Soviet years, the number of Romanian students at the university declined sharply. In 1991–92, the last year of Soviet rule, the number of Romanian students was only 4.44% (434 out of 9,769). Among teaching faculty, the breakdown by nationalities is as follows: Ukrainian teachers 465 (77.1%), Russians 102 (16.9%), Moldovans 9 (1.4%), Romanians 7 (1.1%), Belarusians 6 (0.9%), etc.

Yuriy Fedkovych Chernivtsi National University

Since 2000, when the university was awarded National status, it operates under its current name, Yuriy Fedkovych Chernivtsi National University.

By decision of Session of Council of European University Association, held in Brussels on 15 January 2009, Yuriy Fedkovich Chernivtsi National University was granted a full individual membership in European University Association. On June 29, 2011, the 35th Session of the UNESCO World Heritage Committee decided to include the central building of the university - the former residence of the Metropolitan of Bukovina and Dalmatia, on the World Heritage List.

In 2016, according to the resolution of the Cabinet of Ministers of Ukraine, Bukovina State Financial and Economic University was affiliated to Chernivtsi National University.

, the Rector of Chernivtsi National University is Professor Petryshyn Roman Ivanovich, PhD in Physical and Mathematical Sciences.

Campuses and buildings

Yuriy Fedkovych Chernivtsi National University consists of 17 buildings having a total of 105 units. The total area is 110,800 square meters, including training buildings of 66 square meters.

The architectural ensemble of the main campus of the university, the Residence of Bukovinian and Dalmatian Metropolitans, is included on the list of UNESCO World Heritage Sites.

Institutes and Faculties
Institute of Biology, Chemistry and  Bioresources
Institute of Physics, Engineering and  Computer Studies
Faculty of Geography
Faculty of Economics
Faculty of Modern European Languages 
Faculty of History, Political Science and International Relations
Faculty of Mathematics and Informatics 
Faculty of Pedagogics, Psychology and Social Activity
Faculty of Philology
Faculty of Philosophy and Theology 
Faculty of Law
Faculty of Physical Training and Health
Faculty of Architecture, Construction, Arts and Crafts

Libraries 
The university library was founded in 1852 as Krayova Library — the first public library in Bukovina. By 2004, its total book stock included 2,554,000 copies and among them 1,215,000 copies of scientific literature, 171,000 of textbooks and manuals, and 648,000 of fiction. The fund of foreign books contains 376,000 works in German, Romanian, English, Latin, Polish, Ancient Greek, French, Hebraic, Yiddish and other languages.

The scientific library includes 11 departments: collection, scientific processing, native fund preservation, foreign fund preservation, rare and valuable books, book borrowing, reading halls, branch, cultural work, information technologies and information-bibliographic.

International relations
The university has partnerships with universities in Austria, Belarus, Bulgaria, Bosnia, United Kingdom, Estonia, Israel, Spain, China, Latvia, Moldova, Germany, South Korea, Norway, Poland, Romania, Serbia, Slovenia, Slovakia, United States, Turkey, France, Croatia, Finland, Czech Republic. It participates in projects and in the framework of cross border cooperation programmes such as TEMPUS, EMERGE – Erasmus Mundus European Mobility with Neighboring Region in the East: Ukraine, Moldova, Belarus, Jean Monnet Programme, ERASMUS Programme. It is also a partner of the EUROSCI Network.

Reputation and rankings 
As of April 2019, the Fedkovych Chernivtsi National University is ranked third in the ranking of Ukrainian higher education institutions by the Scopus scientometric database, which provides records of scientists' publications, institutions and statistics of their citation.

Notable professors and alumni
Sydir Vorobkevych (1836-1903), Ukrainian composer and writer.
Ion Nistor (1876–1962) Romanian historian and politician
Alois Handl (1837-1915), Austrian physicist.
Anton Wassmuth (1844-1927), Austrian physicist, member of the German Academy of Sciences Leopoldina.
Anton Marty (1847-1914), Swiss philosopher.
Alexander Georg Supan (1847 - 1920), Austrian geographer.
Leopold Bernhard Gegenbauer (1849 - 1903),  Austrian mathematician.
Georg Elias Müller (1850 - 1934), German experimental psychologist.
Friedrich Becke (1855 - 1931), Austrian mineralogist and petrograph.
Eusebius Mandyczewski, (1857 - 1929), Ukrainian musicologist, composer, conductor, and teacher.
Ivan Franko (1856 - 1916), Ukrainian poet, writer, social and literary critic, journalist, interpreter, economist, political activist.
Eugen Ehrlich (1862 – 1922), legal scholar, one of the primary founders of the modern field of sociology of law.
Josef Geitler von Armingen (1870 - 1923), Austrian physicist.
Victor Conrad (1876-1962), Austrian-American physicist, seismologist and meteorologist, professor of Harvard University.
Nicolae Bălan (1882 – 1955) Romanian cleric, a metropolitan bishop of the Romanian Orthodox Church
Joseph Schumpeter (1883–1950), one of the most influential economists of the 20th century, professor of Harvard University.
Hans Hahn (1879 – 1934), Austrian mathematician, one of the founders of modern functional analysis.
Josip Plemelj (1873 - 1967), Slovene mathematician.
Nikolay Bogolyubov (1909-1992), Soviet mathematician and theoretical physicist. 
Arseniy Yatsenyuk, Ukrainian politician, economist and Ukrainian Prime-Minister.

Honorary doctors

Leonid Kadeniuk, the first astronaut of Ukraine.
Lina Kostenko, Ukrainian poet and writer.
Heinz Fischer, the President of Austria.
Ray Hnatyshyn, 24th Governor General of Canada. 
Roy Romanow, the 12th Premier of Saskatchewan (1991–2001).

Interesting facts 
First Ukrainian mystery thriller (The Shadows of Unforgotten Ancestors (Tini nezabutykh predkiv), 2013) was directed mostly on the territory of Chernivtsi University.

See also 
 List of modern universities in Europe (1801–1945)

References

External links

 chnu.edu.ua - Chernivtsi University official site
 Chernivtsi University in Encyclopedia of Ukraine
 chnu.cv.ua - The architectural complex of Bukovian metropolitan's residence

 
Buildings and structures in Chernivtsi
Educational institutions established in 1875
1875 establishments in Austria-Hungary
National universities in Ukraine